This is a list of Chinese animated tv shows sorted by year. in Mainland China, Hong Kong and Taiwan; they are in Mandarin Chinese language only:

List of Chinese animated shows in Each decade

1980s
 Calabash Brothers / 葫芦兄弟 (1987)
 Slovenly Boy's Adventure / 邋遢大王历险记 (1987)
 Black Cat Detective / 黑猫警长 (1987)

1990s

Abenmao
The Blood Sword
Cyber Weapon Z / 超神Z (1993)
 Big-Headed Kid and Small-Headed Father / 大头儿子和小头爸爸 (1995)
 'Journey to the West – Legends of the Monkey King (1998)
 3000 Whys of Blue Cat	/ 蓝猫淘气三千 (1999)

2000s

 Devil Microchip /魔鬼芯片 (2001)
 Music Up / 我为歌狂 (2001)As the Bell RingsCentury SonnyDinosaur Baby Holy HeroesFive Lucky Mouse Wanderings of Sanmao (2005)
 Young Go Players / 围棋少年 (2005)
 The Dreaming Girl (2005)
The Adventures of Little Carp / 小鲤鱼历险记l (2006)
 Desire for Sky / 渴望蓝天 (2006)
 Romance of the Three Kingdoms (2009 animation)
Fruity Robo / 果宝特攻GG BondHomer and LandauKeke's StoryThe Legend of Condor HeroLittle CherryLittle Soldier Zhang GaThe Adventures of Little CarpThe Olympic Adventures of FuwaPleasant Goat and Big Big WolfPleasant Goat and Big Big Wolf - Pleasant Goat Sports GameShalanShaolin WuzangSkyEyeTortoise Hanba's StoriesXingxing FoxZentrixThe Legend of Qin2010sA.UAI Football GGOAstro PlanBicycle BoyBoonie BearsDragon WarriorVary PeriThe Legend of Lucky PieCupid's ChocolatesSchool ShockPleasant Goat and Big Big WolfSpirit Blade MountainBloodivoresNuwa Chengzhang RijiHappy Heroes Cheating CraftTo Be HeroAbu the Little DinosaurShuangsheng LingtanChōyū SekaiSpiritpactThe Silver GuardianRakshasa StreetYaoguai MingdanCinderella Chef (萌妻食神 )The King's Avatar (全职高手)Guomin Laogong Dai HuijiaMu Qi LingKodamaYeloliInfinity NadoScreechers Wild! (Opti-Morphs)Nana MoonValt the Wonder DeerMaiquan & KekeNanoCoreTwin MoonsRevelationNine Songs of the Moving HeavensBloody CodeGunslayer LegendStitch & AiSoul LandHua Jianghu Zhi Bu Liang Ren (A Portrait of Jianghu: Rivers and Lakes)Hua Jianghu Zhi Ling Zhu (A Portrait of Jianghu: Spirit Master / Painted Jianghu 2)Hua Jianghu Zhi Bei Mo Ting (A Portrait of Jianghu: Mourning Toast)Hua Jianghu Zhi Huanshi MenshengSpiritual Cage: IncarnationMole's WorldThe Small GiantYear Hare AffairLuo Bao BeiMo Dao Zu Shi, also known as Grandmaster of Demonic Cultivation (The Founder of Diabolism)Douluo DaluP. King DucklingBattle Through the Heavens (Dou Puo Cang Qiong)There's a Pit in My Senior Martial Brother's Brain (Wo Jia Da Shi Xiong Nao Zi You Keng)Tales of Demons and Gods (Yao Shen Ji)The Young Imperial GuardsBringing the Nation's Husband Home (Guo Min Lao Gong Dai Hui Jia)Transcend the Gods: The Black Troop (Chao Shen Xue Yuan: Xiong Bing Lian)Zombie Brother (Shi Xiong)Bai Ye Ling LongFilly FuntasiaMy Cultivator Girlfriend (Wo De Tian Jie Nu You)My Holy Weapon (Wo De Nitian Shenqi)I am Bai Xiaofei (Wo Jia Bai Xiao Fei)The Devil Ring (Jie Mo Ren)The Legend of Luo Xiaohei (Luo Xiao Hei Zhan Ji)Lan Mo's Flower (Lan Mo De Hua)Immemorial Love For YouKiller SevenThe Great Warrior WallJian Wang 3 - Xia Gan Yi Dan Shen Jian XinThousand AutumnsLegend of ExorcismPsychic PrincessBusted! DarklordHey, Your Ears Are Showing!Memories of ChanganMiracle Star2020sBuddiDeer SquadKung Fu Wa Heibai Wuchang
 The Daily Life of the Immortal KingLink ClickHeaven Official's Blessing''

See also
List of Chinese animated films

References

 
Lists of animated series
Lists of animated television series
Animated series